Jorge Preá, full name Jorge Arnaldo Pereira, (born 10 January 1984 in São Paulo city), is a Brazilian football player at the position of striker. he is currently retired.

Honours
São Paulo State Championship: 2008

External links
Profile at Globo Esporte's Futpedia

1984 births
Living people
Brazilian footballers
Footballers from São Paulo (state)
Sociedade Esportiva Palmeiras players
Grêmio Barueri Futebol players
Association football forwards